The 2014 County Championship Shield was the 10th version of the annual English rugby union County Championship, organized by the RFU for the tier 3 English counties.  Each county drew its players from rugby union clubs from the fifth tier and below of the English rugby union league system.  The counties were divided into three pools of four teams each, based roughly on regional lines, with the winner of each group plus the best runner-up going through to the semi-finals, with the winners of those games meeting in the final held at Twickenham Stadium. Typically there is no promotion or relegation out of or into the County Championship Shield, although Surrey's dominance over the past couple of competitions meant that they had a chance of being invited to take part in tier 2 the following season.  The competition would also welcome Staffordshire, who did not play in the county championship last year, replacing Sussex.  Surrey were the reigning champions.

After winning their respective groups and semi final games, Surrey faced Leicestershire in the final at Twickenham, in what would be Surrey's third consecutive Shield final.  Having won the previous two finals, Surrey made it a hat trick (and fourth Shield title overall) as they defeated Leicestershire 39–16.  This would also be Surrey's last season in the third tier as their performances would see them promoted to the 2015 County Championship Plate.

Competition format
The competition format consisted of four pools (one of four teams, the others with three), based roughly on regional lines where possible, with each team playing each other once. The top side of each group qualified for the semi-finals, with the winners of the semi-finals playing in the final held at Twickenham Stadium on 1 June 2014.  As the lowest tier in the county championship there is no relegation while promotion is not given every season, although outstanding county performances (such as Surrey's) can lead to counties moving up to tier 2.

Participating counties and ground locations

Group stage

Pool 1

Round 1

Round 2

Round 3

Pool 2

Round 1

Round 2

Round 3

Pool 3

Round 1

Round 2

Round 3

Pool 4

Round 1

Round 2

Round 3

Knock-out Stage

Semi-finals

Final

See also
 English rugby union system
 Rugby union in England

References

External links
 NCA Rugby

2014
2013–14 County Championship